Mona Solheim (born 4 August 1979) is a Norwegian taekwondo practitioner. 
She competed at the 1999, 2007, 2009 and 2011 World Taekwondo Championships.
She won a bronze medal in lightweight at the 2007 World Taekwondo Championships in Beijing, after being defeated by eventual world champion Karine Sergerie in the semifinal.

She is a sister of Nina Solheim. They were adopted from South Korea and grew up in Namsos.

References

External links

1979 births
Living people
People from Namsos
Norwegian female taekwondo practitioners
South Korean emigrants to Norway
World Taekwondo Championships medalists
21st-century Norwegian women